Darker Still is the seventh studio album by Australian metalcore band Parkway Drive. It was released on 9 September 2022 through Resist and Epitaph Records. The album was produced by George Hadji-Christou.

Background and promotion
On 11 January 2022, the band announced a North American tour in May and June, supported by Hatebreed, The Black Dahlia Murder, and Stick to Your Guns. However, on 6 April, they announced the cancellation of the tour, stating that "the relentless nature of being in this band has given us very little time to reflect on who we are as individuals, who we want to be and the toll it is taking on ourselves and our friendships." On 23 May, it was announced that for their mental health, Parkway Drive would be taking a break from activity, but clarified that they "are here to stay". 

On 7 June, following a series of teasers released on various social media, the band unveiled a brand new single entitled "Glitch" along with a music video. On 8 June, the band announced that their Fall 2022 European tour with Lorna Shore and While She Sleeps would continue as scheduled with a rebrand, and new music to accompany said tour. On 6 July, the band released the second single "The Greatest Fear" and its corresponding music video. At the same time, they officially announced the album itself while also revealed the album cover, the track list and release date. On 22 August, the band published the third single and title track "Darker Still".

Critical reception

The album received generally positive reviews from music critics. Kerrang! gave the album 4 out of 5 and stated: "Parkway went through hell making this record and they've got the scars to prove it, but they made it out alive to continue their rocket-powered trajectory. These songs of strength survival aren't platitudes, they're promises." Louder Sound gave the album a positive review and stated: "A continuation of the steady evolution over the band's past few efforts, Darker Stills distillation of ideas into a more methodical, deliberate sound is perfectly aimed for the arenas and headline slots the band now comfortably occupy."

Rock 'N' Load praised the album saying, "Darker Still is start to finish unreal. Leave all your preconceived ideas at the door, open your mind and ignore the negativity from the noisy minority, this album will help people through tough times and show them a way through life's shit." Simon Crampton of Rock Sins rated the album 8 out of 10 and said: "Darker Still will no doubt be a divisive record, it's already proving to be before it's even been released. It is a dense, multi-layered album that showcases Parkway Drive at a creative peak. Free of the shackles that others have tried to place on them, they have spread their wings and constructed one of the most expansive, heartfelt and interesting releases of their career." Wall of Sound gave the album almost perfect score 9/10 and saying: "Darker Still isn't just an album, it's a frantic journey of self-discovery that establishes the Byron Bay exports as not only the biggest band in Aussie heavy metal right now, but firmly cements them as key players in the future of heavy music on a global scale. From the shift in genres that'll find them performing alongside ICONS of the industry, through to the throwback sounds that made them local heroes of the scene, this new monster of a release is straight-up heavy for everyone."

Track listing

Personnel
Parkway Drive
 Winston McCall – lead vocals, whistle
 Jeff Ling – lead guitar, whistle
 Luke "Pig" Kilpatrick – rhythm guitar
 Jia "Pie" O'Connor – bass
 Ben "Gaz" Gordon – drums, composition

Additional musicians
 Gordon Hamilton – choir arrangement, conduction, orchestral arrangements, organ
 John Rotar – choir conduction
 Chady Awad, Ramon Ortiz and Maxim Pike – vocals
 Pierre Bouvier and Molly Lewis – whistle

Additional personnel
 George Hadji-Christou – production, vocals, bass, guitar, synthesizers, programming, composition
 Dean Hadji-Christou, Andreas Wiedenhoff and David Spearritt – engineering
 Reinert Wasserman and Stewart Geddes – engineering assistant
 Zakk Cervini – mixing
 Nik Trekov – mixing assistant
 Ted Jensen – mastering
 Dan Strong – drum technician
 Hedi Xandt – artwork, layout

Charts

References

2022 albums
Parkway Drive albums
Epitaph Records albums
Resist Records albums